American Publishers Association (APA) was created in 1901 to maintain the price of copyright books in the American market.

In 1913, the New York Supreme court ruled in favor of R. H Macy's & Co. vs American Publishers Association, saying Macy's was entitled to damages of $140,000.

Its founding members were Charles Scribner as President, Gen. Alexander C. McClurg and George Mifflin as Vice Presidents, George Platt Brett, Sr., of Macmillan Publishers as Secretary, and G. B. M. Harvey, of Harper Brothers, as treasurer.

Notable members
 Frank Dodd, Dodd, Mead and Company, former President of the American Publishers Association

See also
 Books in the United States

References

External links

Archival collections
Guide to the Darrell Kerr Correspondence with American Poets and Publishers. Special Collections and Archives, The UC Irvine Libraries, Irvine, California.

Publishing-related professional associations
Organizations based in Chicago
Book publishing in the United States
1901 establishments in Illinois